Fossli is a surname. Notable people with the surname include:

Grethe Fossli (born 1954), Norwegian politician
Sondre Turvoll Fossli (born 1993), Norwegian cross-country skier
Willy Fossli (1931–2017), Norwegian footballer 

Norwegian-language surnames